Britta Altenkamp (born 16 September 1964) is a German politician from the Social Democratic Party of Germany. She is a member of the Landtag of North Rhine-Westphalia since 2000. From 1994 to 2000 she was a member of the Council of Essen City

References

1964 births
Living people
Politicians from Essen
Women members of State Parliaments in Germany
Members of the Landtag of North Rhine-Westphalia
Social Democratic Party of Germany politicians
20th-century German politicians
20th-century German women politicians
21st-century German politicians
21st-century German women politicians